Chiyo Bhanjyang (also known as Chiwa Bhanjyang or Chiya Bhanjyang) is an international mountain pass located at Nepal-Sikkim (India) border. The Mid-Hills Highway (Pushpalal Highway) starts from here and runs across the mid-hills in Nepal. Across the border, in Sikkim "Uttarey-Chiwa Bhanjyang road" starts and connects Gangtok at 170 km of distance.

References

External links
Joint Press Statement on the Visit of the Prime Minister to Nepal
Chiwa Bhanjyang Archives

Mountain passes of Nepal
Mountain passes of India
India–Nepal border crossings
Geography of Nepal
Mountain passes of Sikkim
Mountain passes of the Himalayas